Achaearanea is a genus of comb-footed spiders that was first described by Embrik Strand in 1929.

It used to include the extremely abundant common house spider, which was transferred to genus Parasteatoda in 2006, together with many other species. A. veruculata and many more species were moved to genus Cryptachaea in 2008. Others were moved to the revived Henziectypus. The genus was thus reduced from about 150 species to about 22 species during major revisions. Possibly even more species should be transferred to other genera.

Description
This genus includes small and large theridiids. The legs are medium long, with spines and usually many hairs. Their web is an irregular network of threads, usually in a sheltered place.

Distribution
Species are found around the world, with several species from South America, China and Korea, India, Australia and Africa. Some species are endemic to several small islands.

Species
 it contains twenty-eight species, found in Central America, South America, Asia, Africa, Australia, on the Canary Islands, and in Puerto Rico:
Achaearanea alboinsignita Locket, 1980 – Comoros
Achaearanea baltoformis Yin & Peng, 2012 – China
Achaearanea biarclata Yin & Bao, 2012 – China
Achaearanea budana Tikader, 1970 – India
Achaearanea coilioducta Yin, 2012 – China
Achaearanea diglipuriensis Tikader, 1977 – India (Andaman Is.)
Achaearanea disparata Denis, 1965 – Gabon, Ivory Coast
Achaearanea diversipes (Rainbow, 1920) – Australia (Norfolk Is., Lord Howe Is.)
Achaearanea dubitabilis Wunderlich, 1987 – Canary Is.
Achaearanea durgae Tikader, 1970 – India
Achaearanea epicosma (Rainbow, 1920) – Australia (Lord Howe Is.)
Achaearanea extumida Xing, Gao & Zhu, 1994 – China
Achaearanea flavomaculata Yin, 2012 – China
Achaearanea globispira Henschel & Jocqué, 1994 – South Africa
Achaearanea hieroglyphica (Mello-Leitão, 1940) – Peru, Brazil, French Guiana
Achaearanea inopinata Brignoli, 1972 – Venezuela
Achaearanea linhan Yin & Bao, 2012 – China
Achaearanea machaera Levi, 1959 – Panama
Achaearanea maricaoensis (Bryant, 1942) – Panama, Puerto Rico
Achaearanea micratula (Banks, 1909) – Costa Rica
Achaearanea nigrodecorata (Rainbow, 1920) – Australia (Lord Howe Is.)
Achaearanea palgongensis Seo, 1993 – Korea
Achaearanea propera (Keyserling, 1890) – Australia (New South Wales, Tasmania, Lord Howe Is.)
Achaearanea septemguttata (Simon, 1909) – Vietnam
Achaearanea simaoica Zhu, 1998 – China
Achaearanea tingo Levi, 1963 – Peru, Brazil
Achaearanea trapezoidalis (Taczanowski, 1873) (type) – Panama to Paraguay
Achaearanea triangularis Patel, 2005 – India

Formerly included species
A. acoreensis (Berland, 1932) (Transferred to Cryptachaea)
A. alacris (Keyserling, 1884) (Transferred to Cryptachaea)
A. altiventer (Keyserling, 1884) (Transferred to Cryptachaea)
A. ambera Levi, 1963 (Transferred to Cryptachaea)
A. analista Levi, 1963 (Transferred to Cryptachaea)
A. anastema Levi, 1963 (Transferred to Cryptachaea)
A. angulithorax (Bösenberg & Strand, 1906) (Transferred to Parasteatoda)
A. anna Levi, 1959 (Transferred to Hentziectypus)
A. apex Levi, 1959 (Transferred to Hentziectypus)
A. asiatica (Bösenberg & Strand, 1906) (Transferred to Parasteatoda)
A. azteca (Chamberlin & Ivie, 1936) (Transferred to Cryptachaea)
A. banosensis Levi, 1963 (Transferred to Cryptachaea)
A. barra Levi, 1963 (Transferred to Cryptachaea)
A. bellula (Keyserling, 1891) (Transferred to Cryptachaea)
A. bentifica (Keyserling, 1891) (Transferred to Cryptachaea)
A. blattea (Urquhart, 1886) (Transferred to Cryptachaea)
A. boqueronica (Kraus, 1955) (Transferred to Parasteatoda)
A. brookesiana Barrion & Litsinger, 1995 (Transferred to Parasteatoda)
A. caboverdensis Schmidt & Piepho, 1994 (Transferred to Paidiscura)
A. caliensis Levi, 1963 (Transferred to Cryptachaea)
A. cambridgei (Petrunkevitch, 1911) (Transferred to Chrysso)
A. campanulata Chen, 1993 (Transferred to Campanicola)
A. camura (Simon, 1877) (Transferred to Parasteatoda)
A. canionis (Chamberlin & Gertsch, 1929) (Transferred to Cryptachaea)
A. caqueza Levi, 1963 (Transferred to Cryptachaea)
A. catapetraea (Gertsch & Archer, 1942) (Transferred to Cryptachaea)
A. celsabdomina Zhu, 1998 (Transferred to Parasteatoda)
A. chilensis Levi, 1963 (Transferred to Cryptachaea)
A. chiricahua Levi, 1955 (Transferred to Cryptachaea)
A. cingulata Zhu, 1998 (Transferred to Parasteatoda)
A. cinnabarina Levi, 1963 (Transferred to Cryptachaea)
A. conigera (Simon, 1914) (Transferred to Achaeridion)
A. conjuncta (Gertsch & Mulaik, 1936) (Transferred to Hentziectypus)
A. credula (Gertsch & Davis, 1936) (Transferred to Hentziectypus)
A. culicivora (Bösenberg & Strand, 1906) (Transferred to Parasteatoda)
A. dalana Buckup & Marques, 1991 (Transferred to Cryptachaea)
A. daliensis Zhu, 1998 (Transferred to Parasteatoda)
A. dea Buckup & Marques, 2006 (Transferred to Cryptachaea)
A. decorata (L. Koch, 1867) (Transferred to Parasteatoda)
A. diamantina Levi, 1963 (Transferred to Cryptachaea)
A. digitus Buckup & Marques, 2006 (Transferred to Cryptachaea)
A. dromedaria (Simon, 1880) (Transferred to Paidiscura)
A. dromedariformis (Roewer, 1942) (Transferred to Cryptachaea)
A. ducta Zhu, 1998 (Transferred to Parasteatoda)
A. eramus Levi, 1963 (Transferred to Cryptachaea)
A. extrilida (Keyserling, 1890) (Transferred to Cryptachaea)
A. ferrumequina (Bösenberg & Strand, 1906) (Transferred to Campanicola)
A. florendida Levi, 1959 (Transferred to Hentziectypus)
A. fordum (Caporiacco, 1954) (Transferred to Cryptachaea)
A. fresno Levi, 1955 (Transferred to Cryptachaea)
A. galeiforma Zhu, Zhang & Xu, 1991 (Transferred to Parasteatoda)
A. geochares Levi, 1955 (Transferred to Cryptachaea)
A. gibberosa (Kulczyński, 1899) (Transferred to Echinotheridion)
A. gigantea (Keyserling, 1884) (Transferred to Cryptachaea)
A. globosa (Hentz, 1850) (Transferred to Hentziectypus)
A. guadalupensis (Keyserling, 1884) (Transferred to Cryptachaea)
A. gui Zhu, 1998 (Transferred to Parasteatoda)
A. hammeni Chrysanthus, 1963 (Transferred to Parasteatoda)
A. herbigrada (Simon, 1873) (Transferred to Neottiura)
A. hermosillo Levi, 1959 (Transferred to Hentziectypus)
A. hirta (Taczanowski, 1873) (Transferred to Cryptachaea)
A. ignota (Keyserling, 1884) (Transferred to Cryptachaea)
A. index (Chamberlin & Ivie, 1944) (Transferred to Coleosoma)
A. inops Levi, 1963 (Transferred to Cryptachaea)
A. insulsa (Gertsch & Mulaik, 1936) (Transferred to Cryptachaea)
A. isana Levi, 1963 (Transferred to Cryptachaea)
A. japonica (Bösenberg & Strand, 1906) (Transferred to Parasteatoda)
A. jequirituba Levi, 1963 (Transferred to Cryptachaea)
A. jinghongensis Zhu, 1998 (Transferred to Parasteatoda)
A. kaindi Levi, Lubin & Robinson, 1982 (Transferred to Parasteatoda)
A. kaspi Levi, 1963 (Transferred to Cryptachaea)
A. koepckei Levi, 1963 (Transferred to Cryptachaea)
A. kompirensis (Bösenberg & Strand, 1906) (Transferred to Parasteatoda)
A. krausi Chrysanthus, 1963 (Transferred to Parasteatoda)
A. labarda Roberts, 1983 (Transferred to Bardala)
A. lanyuensis Yoshida, Tso & Severinghaus, 2000 (Transferred to Parasteatoda)
A. leguiai (Chamberlin, 1916) (Transferred to Theridion)
A. liaoyuanensis Zhu & Yu, 1982 (Transferred to Theridion)
A. longiducta Zhu, 1998 (Transferred to Parasteatoda)
A. lota Levi, 1963 (Transferred to Cryptachaea)
A. luculenta (Bryant, 1940) (Transferred to Chrysso)
A. lunata (Clerck, 1757) (Transferred to Parasteatoda)
A. lunata (Olivier, 1789) (Transferred to Parasteatoda)
A. lunata (Franganillo, 1930) (Transferred to Parasteatoda)
A. manzanillo Levi, 1959 (Transferred to Cryptachaea)
A. maraca Buckup & Marques, 1991 (Transferred to Cryptachaea)
A. maronica (Caporiacco, 1954) (Transferred to Cryptachaea)
A. maxima (Keyserling, 1891) (Transferred to Cryptachaea)
A. mea (Bösenberg & Strand, 1906) (Transferred to Campanicola)
A. meraukensis Chrysanthus, 1963 (Transferred to Cryptachaea)
A. mesax Levi, 1959 (Transferred to Parasteatoda)
A. migrans (Keyserling, 1884) (Transferred to Cryptachaea)
A. milagro Levi, 1963 (Transferred to Cryptachaea)
A. mundula (L. Koch, 1872) (Transferred to Parasteatoda)
A. nayaritensis Levi, 1959 (Transferred to Cryptachaea)
A. nigrovittata (Keyserling, 1884) (Transferred to Parasteatoda)
A. nipponica Yoshida, 1983 (Transferred to Parasteatoda)
A. nordica (Chamberlin & Ivie, 1947) (Transferred to Chrysso)
A. obnubila (Keyserling, 1891) (Transferred to Parasteatoda)
A. oculiprominens (Saito, 1939) (Transferred to Parasteatoda)
A. ohlerti (Thorell, 1870) (Transferred to Theridion)
A. orana Levi, 1963 (Transferred to Cryptachaea)
A. orgea Levi, 1967 (Transferred to Theridion)
A. oxymaculata Zhu, 1998 (Transferred to Parasteatoda)
A. pallida (Walckenaer, 1841) (Transferred to Parasteatoda)
A. pallipera Levi, 1963 (Transferred to Cryptachaea)
A. pallipes (Keyserling, 1891) (Transferred to Cryptachaea)
A. parana Levi, 1963 (Transferred to Cryptachaea)
A. passiva (Keyserling, 1891) (Transferred to Cryptachaea)
A. picadoi (Banks, 1909) (Transferred to Parasteatoda)
A. pilaton Levi, 1963 (Transferred to Cryptachaea)
A. pinguis (Keyserling, 1886) (Transferred to Cryptachaea)
A. polygramma (Kulczyński, 1911) (Transferred to Parasteatoda)
A. porteri (Banks, 1896) (Transferred to Cryptachaea)
A. portoricensis (Petrunkevitch, 1930) (Transferred to Cryptachaea)
A. projectivulva Yoshida, 2001 (Transferred to Cryptachaea)
A. pusillana (Roewer, 1942) (Transferred to Cryptachaea)
A. pydanieli Buckup & Marques, 1991 (Transferred to Cryptachaea)
A. quadrimaculata Yoshida, Tso & Severinghaus, 2000 (Transferred to Parasteatoda)
A. quadripartita (Keyserling, 1891) (Transferred to Theridion)
A. rafaeli Buckup & Marques, 1991 (Transferred to Hentziectypus)
A. rapa Levi, 1963 (Transferred to Cryptachaea)
A. redempta (Gertsch & Mulaik, 1936) (Transferred to Cryptachaea)
A. rioensis Levi, 1963 (Transferred to Cryptachaea)
A. riparia (Blackwall, 1834) (Transferred to Cryptachaea)
A. rostra Zhu & Zhang, 1992 (Transferred to Cryptachaea)
A. rupicola (Emerton, 1882) (Transferred to Cryptachaea)
A. ryukyu Yoshida, 2000 (Transferred to Parasteatoda)
A. salvadorensis (Kraus, 1955) (Transferred to Cryptachaea)
A. saxatilis (C. L. Koch, 1835) (Transferred to Cryptachaea)
A. schneirlai Levi, 1959 (Transferred to Cryptachaea)
A. schraderorum Levi, 1959 (Transferred to Cryptachaea)
A. schullei (Gertsch & Mulaik, 1936) (Transferred to Hentziectypus)
A. serax Levi, 1959 (Transferred to Hentziectypus)
A. serenoae (Gertsch & Archer, 1942) (Transferred to Cryptachaea)
A. serica (Urquhart, 1886) (Transferred to Steatoda)
A. sicki Levi, 1963 (Transferred to Cryptachaea)
A. simulans (Thorell, 1875) (Transferred to Parasteatoda)
A. simulata (Emerton, 1926) (Transferred to Theridion)
A. songi Zhu, 1998 (Transferred to Parasteatoda)
A. subtabulata Zhu, 1998 (Transferred to Parasteatoda)
A. subvexa Zhu, 1998 (Transferred to Parasteatoda)
A. tabulata Levi, 1980 (Transferred to Parasteatoda)
A. taeniata (Keyserling, 1884) (Transferred to Cryptachaea)
A. taim Buckup & Marques, 2006 (Transferred to Cryptachaea)
A. teja Levi, 1967 (Transferred to Cryptachaea)
A. tepidariorum (C. L. Koch, 1841) (Transferred to Parasteatoda)
A. terex Levi, 1959 (Transferred to Parasteatoda)
A. tesselata (Keyserling, 1884) (Transferred to Parasteatoda)
A. tovarensis Levi, 1963 (Transferred to Cryptachaea)
A. transipora (Zhu & Zhang, 1992) (Transferred to Parasteatoda)
A. triangula Yoshida, 1993 (Transferred to Parasteatoda)
A. triguttata (Keyserling, 1891) (Transferred to Cryptachaea)
A. trinidensis Levi, 1959 (Transferred to Cryptachaea)
A. turquino Levi, 1959 (Transferred to Hentziectypus)
A. umbratica (L. Koch, 1872) (Transferred to Theridion)
A. undata (Keyserling, 1884) (Transferred to Cryptachaea)
A. ungilensis Kim & Kim, 1996 (Transferred to Parasteatoda)
A. uviana Levi, 1963 (Transferred to Cryptachaea)
A. valoka Chrysanthus, 1975 (Transferred to Parasteatoda)
A. veruculata (Urquhart, 1886) (Transferred to Cryptachaea)
A. vervoorti Chrysanthus, 1975 (Transferred to Parasteatoda)
A. vivida (Keyserling, 1891) (Transferred to Cryptachaea)
A. wau Levi, Lubin & Robinson, 1982 (Transferred to Parasteatoda)
A. xinjiangensis Hu & Wu, 1989 (Transferred to Heterotheridion)
A. zonensis Levi, 1959 (Transferred to Cryptachaea)

In synonymy:
A. pentagona (Caporiacco, 1954) = Achaearanea hieroglyphica (Mello-Leitão, 1940)

Nomen dubium
A. quadripunctata (Simon, 1895)

See also
 List of Theridiidae species

References

External links

Araneomorphae genera
Cosmopolitan spiders
Taxa named by Embrik Strand
Theridiidae